The West 7th Street Historic District encompasses a collection of early 20th-century commercial buildings on the 800-1100 blocks of West 7th Street in Little Rock, Arkansas.  The thirteen buildings of the district were built between 1906 and 1951, and are mainly one and two-story masonry buildings with vernacular or modest commercial Italianate style.  The Clok Building at 1001 W. 7th, built in 1915, notably has an elaborate concrete facade.

The district was listed on the National Register of Historic Places in 2009.

See also

National Register of Historic Places listings in Little Rock, Arkansas

References

External links

Historic districts in Little Rock, Arkansas
Historic districts on the National Register of Historic Places in Arkansas
Italianate architecture in Arkansas
National Register of Historic Places in Little Rock, Arkansas